Nikolai Kozyrev may refer to:

Nikolai Aleksandrovich Kozyrev (1908—1983), Soviet astronomer and astrophysicist
Nikolai Kozyrev (diplomat) (1934—2021), Soviet and Russian diplomat